Sceneric was a systems integrator specialising in the development of hybrid eCommerce platforms, delivering new websites, mobile sites, instore apps and warehousing integration.  Sceneric was founded in 2007 by George Brandie, Jim Herbert, Wai Lok Ip and David Wyllie and was headquartered in Newbury in the United Kingdom, with other offices in London, Hong Kong, New York City, Sydney and Wuhan in China.

Sceneric first worked with Financial Services companies in the UK and Hong Kong implementing Service Orientated Architecture, Quote Engine and Content Management System platforms such as Magnolia (CMS), Interwoven and Percussion Rythmyx.  Sceneric staff had skills implementing Oracle ATG and after platform optimisation work on 2 of the UK's largest ATG implementations, took responsibility for full ATG stack implementations for UK retailers.   In 2009, Sceneric partnered with hybris a German platform vendor which is now part of SAP SE.  Sceneric was involved in many hybris implementations.

Sceneric was awarded 
 hybris Service Delivery Partner of the Year 2012
 hybris Global Service Delivery Partner of the Year 2013 
 hybris EMEA Partner of the Year 2013.
 hybris Global Service Delivery Partner of the Year 2014

Sceneric was acquired by DigitasLBi in August 2012. DigitasLBi is itself part of the Publicis Groupe.  In 2015, Sceneric was rebranded as DigitasLBi Commerce.

References 

Publicis Groupe
Systems engineering